The British Academy Award for Most Promising Newcomer to Leading Film Roles is a discontinued award that was presented by the British Academy of Film and Television Arts until 1984.

The category had several name changes:
 1952–1959: Most Promising Newcomer to Film
 1960–1979: Most Promising Newcomer to Leading Film Roles
 1980–1982: Most Outstanding Newcomer to Leading Film Roles
 1983–1984: Most Outstanding Newcomer to Film

Note: The BAFTA site differs on what the category title is for the 1980s, with the actors own pages on the site using the titles given above, while other pages use Most Promising Newcomer to Film.

A similar award honouring new acting talent was introduced in 2006, the Orange Rising Star Award. While the nominees are chosen by the BAFTA juries, the Rising Star winner is decided by the public.

1950s

1960s

1970s

1980s

References

External links
 Official site at BAFTA.org

British Academy Film Awards
 
Awards for young actors